In ancient Rome, a  was a professional jester or buffoon.  were paid for their jests, and the tables of the wealthy were generally open to them for the sake of the amusement they afforded.

There are various theories about the origin of the term. In Horace, Balatro is used as a proper name: . An old scholiast derives the common word  from the proper name, suggesting that buffoons were called  because  was a buffoon, though others have since objected to this account.

References

Footnotes

Jesters
Ancient Roman culture
Ancient Roman occupations
Clowning